Microdevario nana is a species of cyprinid found endemic to Myanmar. It belongs to the genus Microdevario, which contains small danionins.

References

Fish described in 1999
Danios
Microdevario
Fish of Myanmar
Taxobox binomials not recognized by IUCN